In number theory, a prime quadruplet (sometimes called prime quadruple) is a set of four prime numbers of the form  This represents the closest possible grouping of four primes larger than 3, and is the only prime constellation of length 4.

Prime quadruplets 
The first eight prime quadruplets are:

{5, 7, 11, 13}, {11, 13, 17, 19}, {101, 103, 107, 109}, {191, 193, 197, 199}, {821, 823, 827, 829}, {1481, 1483, 1487, 1489}, {1871, 1873, 1877, 1879}, {2081, 2083, 2087, 2089} 

All prime quadruplets except {5, 7, 11, 13} are of the form {30n + 11, 30n + 13, 30n + 17, 30n + 19} for some integer n.  (This structure is necessary to ensure that none of the four primes are divisible by 2, 3 or 5).  A prime quadruplet of this form is also called a prime decade.

A prime quadruplet can be described as a consecutive pair of twin primes, two overlapping sets of prime triplets, or two intermixed pairs of sexy primes.

It is not known if there are infinitely many prime quadruplets.  A proof that there are infinitely many would imply the twin prime conjecture, but it is consistent with current knowledge that there may be infinitely many pairs of twin primes and only finitely many prime quadruplets. The number of prime quadruplets with n digits in base 10 for n = 2, 3, 4, ... is 1, 3, 7, 27, 128, 733, 3869, 23620, 152141, 1028789, 7188960, 51672312, 381226246, 2873279651 .

 the largest known prime quadruplet has 10132 digits. It starts with p = 667674063382677 × 233608 − 1, found by Peter Kaiser.

The constant representing the sum of the reciprocals of all prime quadruplets, Brun's constant for prime quadruplets, denoted by B4, is the sum of the reciprocals of all prime quadruplets:

with value:

B4 = 0.87058 83800 ± 0.00000 00005. 

This constant should not be confused with the Brun's constant for cousin primes, prime pairs of the form (p, p + 4), which is also written as B4.

The prime quadruplet {11, 13, 17, 19} is alleged to appear on the Ishango bone although this is disputed.

Excluding the first prime quadruplet, the shortest possible distance between two quadruplets {p, p+2, p+6, p+8} and {q, q+2, q+6, q+8} is  q - p = 30. The first occurrences of this are for p = 1006301, 2594951, 3919211, 9600551, 10531061, ....

Prime quintuplets
If {p, p+2, p+6, p+8} is a prime quadruplet and p−4 or p+12 is also prime, then the five primes form a prime quintuplet which is the closest admissible constellation of five primes.
The first few prime quintuplets with p+12 are:

{5, 7, 11, 13, 17}, {11, 13, 17, 19, 23}, {101, 103, 107, 109, 113}, {1481, 1483, 1487, 1489, 1493}, {16061, 16063, 16067, 16069, 16073}, {19421, 19423, 19427, 19429, 19433}, {21011, 21013, 21017, 21019, 21023}, {22271, 22273, 22277, 22279, 22283}, {43781, 43783, 43787, 43789, 43793}, {55331, 55333, 55337, 55339, 55343} ... .

The first prime quintuplets with p−4 are:

{7, 11, 13, 17, 19}, {97, 101, 103, 107, 109}, {1867, 1871, 1873, 1877, 1879}, {3457, 3461, 3463, 3467, 3469}, {5647, 5651, 5653, 5657, 5659}, {15727, 15731, 15733, 15737, 15739}, {16057, 16061, 16063, 16067, 16069}, {19417, 19421, 19423, 19427, 19429}, {43777, 43781, 43783, 43787, 43789}, {79687, 79691, 79693, 79697, 79699}, {88807, 88811, 88813, 88817, 88819} ... .

A prime quintuplet contains two close pairs of twin primes, a prime quadruplet, and three overlapping prime triplets.

It is not known if there are infinitely many prime quintuplets. Once again, proving the twin prime conjecture might not necessarily prove that there are also infinitely many prime quintuplets. Also, proving that there are infinitely many prime quadruplets might not necessarily prove that there are infinitely many prime quintuplets.

Prime sextuplets

If both p−4 and p+12 are prime then it becomes a prime sextuplet. The first few:

{7, 11, 13, 17, 19, 23}, {97, 101, 103, 107, 109, 113}, {16057, 16061, 16063, 16067, 16069, 16073}, {19417, 19421, 19423, 19427, 19429, 19433}, {43777, 43781, 43783, 43787, 43789, 43793} 

Some sources also call {5, 7, 11, 13, 17, 19} a prime sextuplet. Our definition, all cases of primes {p-4, p, p+2, p+6, p+8, p+12}, follows from defining a prime sextuplet as the closest admissible constellation of six primes. 

A prime sextuplet contains two close pairs of twin primes, a prime quadruplet, four overlapping prime triplets, and two overlapping prime quintuplets.

All prime sextuplets except {7, 11, 13, 17, 19, 23} are of the form {210n + 97, 210n + 101, 210n + 103, 210n + 107, 210n + 109, 210n + 113} for some integer n.  (This structure is necessary to ensure that none of the six primes is divisible by 2, 3, 5 or 7).

It is not known if there are infinitely many prime sextuplets. Once again, proving the twin prime conjecture might not necessarily prove that there are also infinitely many prime sextuplets. Also, proving that there are infinitely many prime quintuplets might not necessarily prove that there are infinitely many prime sextuplets.

Prime k-tuples

Prime quadruplets, quintuplets, and sextuplets are examples of prime constellations, and prime constellations are in turn examples of prime k-tuples.  A prime constellation is a grouping of  primes, with minimum prime  and maximum prime , meeting the following two conditions:

 Not all residues modulo  are represented for any prime 

More generally, a prime k-tuple occurs if the first condition but not necessarily the second condition is met.

References

.

Classes of prime numbers
Unsolved problems in mathematics